CJDM-FM is a French-language Canadian radio station located in Drummondville, Quebec.

It is owned and operated by Bell Media, and broadcasts on 92.1 MHz with an effective radiated power of 3,000 watts (class A) using an omnidirectional antenna.

The station has a mainstream rock format and is part of the "Énergie" network which operates across Quebec.

The station was acquired by Corus Entertainment in 2001, and later by Astral Media in 2005, when Astral swapped its AM stations for Corus's smaller FM stations and adopting the "Énergie" branding at the same time. (Énergie was heard from 2001 to 2003 on now-sister station CHRD-FM.)

References

External links
 Énergie 92.1
 

Drummondville
Jdm
Jdm
Jdm
Jdm
Year of establishment missing